In the Red may refer to:
In the Red (novel), a novel by Mark Tavener
In the Red (radio series), a 1995 BBC black comedy-crime drama series based on the novel
In the Red (TV series), a 1998 BBC black comedy-crime drama series based on the novel
In the Red (EP), an EP by A Global Threat
In the Red (Tina Dico album), a 2006 album
"In the Red", a 2019 or 2020 Raye Zagazora song under her album Red
In the Red (Kind of Like Spitting album), a 2005 album
In the Red (Crucified Barbara album), a 2014 album by Crucified Barbara
In the Red Records, an American record label